Reid Duke (born January 28, 1996) is a Canadian professional ice hockey centre who is currently playing for HC Slovan Bratislava of the Slovak Extraliga. 

He most recently played for the Henderson Silver Knights in the American Hockey League (AHL). Reid was the first player to sign a contract with the expansion Vegas Golden Knights of the National Hockey League (NHL) in 2017.

Playing career
Duke started his junior ice hockey career with the Lethbridge Hurricanes of the Western Hockey League after being selected fifth in the 2011 WHL Bantam Draft. He was traded to Brandon three years later, after being selected in the sixth round of the 2014 NHL entry draft by the Minnesota Wild. In 2016, he won the WHL Championship, the Ed Chynoweth Cup, with the Wheat Kings.

During his final year of junior hockey in the 2016–17 season, he became the first player in franchise history to be signed by the Vegas Golden Knights after agreeing to a three-year entry-level contract on March 6, 2017. At the conclusion of his season and junior career with the Wheat Kings, Duke signed a professional try-out contract on April 7, 2017, with the Chicago Wolves in the American Hockey League, then serving as the affiliate to the St. Louis Blues, but did not appear in any games that season for the Wolves. The Wolves then became the affiliate for Golden Knights for the next three seasons. Duke did not make his professional debut with the Wolves until February 2018 as he injured his shoulder and required surgery after attending his first rookie camp with the Golden Knights in the 2017 offseason. Duke played in 99 games and scored 31 points over his three seasons with the Wolves. He then played for the Golden Knights' new AHL affiliate, the Henderson Silver Knights, in the shortened 2020–21 season.

After his entry-level contract with the Golden Knights ended in 2021, he was not re-signed. On September 17, 2021, he signed an AHL contract to stay with the Silver Knights for the 2021–22 season.

Career statistics

Regular season and playoffs

International

References

External links
 

1996 births
Living people
Brandon Wheat Kings players
Canadian ice hockey centres
Chicago Wolves players
HK Nitra players
Henderson Silver Knights players
Lethbridge Hurricanes players
Minnesota Wild draft picks
Ice hockey people from Calgary
Ice hockey players at the 2012 Winter Youth Olympics
HC Slovan Bratislava players
Canadian expatriate ice hockey players in the United States
Canadian expatriate ice hockey players in Slovakia